Dolgovaške Gorice is a settlement in the hills east of Lendava in the Prekmurje region of Slovenia. It lies on the border with Hungary.

References

External links
Dolgovaške Gorice on Geopedia

Populated places in the Municipality of Lendava